Richard Paul Senese is an American psychologist, academic administrator, and former politician serving as the president of Capella University since 2016. He was chair of the Minnesota Democratic–Farmer–Labor Party from 1997 to 1999.

Life 
Senese is from Iron Range Township, Itasca County, Minnesota. He completed a Ph.D. in the counseling and student personnel psychology program at the University of Minnesota. His November 1997 dissertation was titled, An analogue approach to understanding the impact of spontaneous metaphors. John L. Romano was his advisor.

Senese was a campaign and staff aid to U.S. senator Paul Wellstone. He worked as a psychology instructor at St. Olaf College. In 1997, Senese succeeded Mark Andrew as chair of the Minnesota Democratic–Farmer–Labor Party. In March 1999, he announced that he would not seek reelection.

Senese was a faculty member at Metropolitan State University and College of St. Scholastica. For 13 years, he worked in administration at the University of Minnesota Extension as its founding associate dean for the center for community vitality and later the Extension's senior associate dean. He was the associate dean of the Capella University's Harold Abel School of Psychology. In 2014, he became Capella University's vice president of academic affairs and chief academic officer. In 2016, he served as interim president for ten months. He was named president in November 2016.

Senese is gay and an advocate for the LGBTQ community.

References 

Living people
Year of birth missing (living people)
Place of birth missing (living people)
21st-century American psychologists
20th-century American psychologists
20th-century American LGBT people
21st-century American LGBT people
People from Itasca County, Minnesota
University of Minnesota alumni
St. Olaf College faculty
University of Minnesota faculty
American gay men
Gay academics
Heads of universities and colleges in the United States
LGBT people from Minnesota
State political party chairs of Minnesota
Minnesota Democrats
Gay politicians
American LGBT politicians
Capella University faculty
LGBT psychologists